Mary (Molly) Joyce Marples (née Ransford; 1908 - 1998) was a microbial ecologist/medical mycologist who spent most of her career conducting research and teaching at the University of Otago in New Zealand from her appointment in 1946 until her retirement in 1967. She is noted as an early proponent of the theory that skin provides an ecosystem that supports a diversity of microorganisms.

Life

Marples was born in Kalimpong in northern India; her parents were missionaries there. She was educated in England and completed a degree in zoology at the University of Oxford.

In 1931 Molly married Brian John Marples.

See also
 Marples, M. J. (1965). The ecology of the human skin. Springfield, Illinois Thomas 
 Marples, M. J. (1969). Life on the human skin. Scientific American.

References

Academic staff of the University of Otago
New Zealand microbiologists
20th-century New Zealand scientists
20th-century biologists

Alumni of Somerville College, Oxford
1908 births
1998 deaths